Amy Lynn Peikoff (née Rambach; born June 7, 1968) is an American writer, blogger, and a professor of philosophy and law. Peikoff is the Chief Policy Officer of social media platform Parler.

Early life and education 
Amy Peikoff studied at the University of California, Los Angeles, where she earned her Bachelor of Science degree in Mathematics and Applied Science in 1992 and her Juris Doctor in 1998, having attended her first year of law school at Pepperdine University. She was an editor of the UCLA Law Review. She then earned her Doctor of Philosophy in Philosophy at the University of Southern California in 2003.

Career 
Amy Peikoff is a member of the State Bar of California, having been admitted in May 2002. She has worked with The Association for Objective Law, an organization that promotes Objectivism in the legal sector, and her legal work has included the submission of an amicus curiae brief in support of Elián González's right of residence in the United States.

Peikoff has taught law and philosophy at Southwestern Law School, Chapman University, the United States Air Force Academy, the University of North Carolina at Chapel Hill, and the University of Texas at Austin. She has also spoken to audiences at DePaul University and Stanford University. Her specialisms include privacy, intellectual property, and Objectivism.

She has contributed articles to the NYU Journal of Law & Liberty, The Virginia Journal of Social Policy and the Law, the Brandeis Law Journal, Philosophical Explorations, Ethics, The Philadelphia Inquirer, the Los Angeles Times, The Washington Times, and to books such as Essays on Ayn Rand's Anthem and Essays on Ayn Rand's The Fountainhead. She was interviewed for the 2011 documentary film, Ayn Rand & the Prophecy of Atlas Shrugged, and she is an occasional guest host of The Tammy Bruce Show.

Peikoff runs an Objectivist blog and podcast called Don't Let It Go, named after an essay in Ayn Rand's Philosophy: Who Needs It. She also co-hosts the Yaron & Amy Show podcast with Yaron Brook.

Personal life
She is the ex-wife of fellow Objectivist scholar Leonard Peikoff and the ex-stepmother of novelist Kira Peikoff.

See also 
 American philosophy
 Ethical egoism
 Free market
 Objectivist movement
 Philosophical realism
 Rational egoism

References

External links
 

1968 births
21st-century American non-fiction writers
American women academics
American women journalists
Chapman University School of Law faculty
Living people
Objectivism scholars
Objectivists
Pepperdine University School of Law alumni
Southwestern Law School
University of California, Los Angeles alumni
UCLA School of Law alumni
University of North Carolina at Chapel Hill faculty
University of Southern California alumni
University of Texas at Austin faculty
United States Air Force Academy faculty
20th-century American women writers
21st-century American women writers
American women legal scholars
American legal scholars